Pimelia rugulosa is a species of darkling beetle. It is endemic to Malta.

References 

Endemic fauna of Malta
rugulosa